The 1931–32 League of Ireland was the eleventh season of the League of Ireland. Shelbourne were the defending champions.

Shamrock Rovers won their fourth title.

Overview
No new teams were elected to the League.

Teams

Table

Results

Top goalscorers

See also 

 1931–32 FAI Cup

References

Ireland
Lea
League of Ireland seasons